Candelina is a genus of lichenized fungi in the family Candelariaceae. It contains 3 species. The genus was circumscribed by lichenologist Josef Poelt in 1974.

References

Candelariales
Lichen genera
Taxa described in 1974
Taxa named by Josef Poelt